Ancylolomia capensis is a species of moth in the family Crambidae. this species is known from central, eastern and southern Africa (Congo, Kenya, Mozambique, Rwanda, South Africa and Madagascar).

References

External links
 Swedish Museum of Natural History - picture of typus

Moths described in 1852
Ancylolomia
Moths of Sub-Saharan Africa
Moths of Madagascar